Council of the European Union decisions on designer drugs. Council of the European Union issued a set of decisions on 7 designer drugs to make them subject to control measures and criminal provisions.

List of substances

paramethoxymethamphetamine (PMMA)
2C-I
2C-T-2
2C-T-7
2,4,5-trimethoxyamphetamine (TMA-2)
benzylpiperazine (BZP)
mephedrone (4-MMC)

Decisions 

Decisions based on Joint Action 97/396/JHA of 16 June 1997 adopted by the Council on the basis of Article K.3 of the Treaty on European Union, concerning the information exchange, risk assessment and the control of new synthetic drugs:
Council Decision 2002/188/JHA of 28 February 2002 concerning control measures and criminal sanctions in respect of the new synthetic drug PMMA
Council Decision 2003/847/JHA of 27 November 2003 concerning control measures and criminal sanctions in respect of the new synthetic drugs 2C-I, 2C-T-2, 2C-T-7 and TMA-2

Decisions based on Council Decision 2005/387/JHA of 10 May 2005 on the information exchange, risk-assessment and control of new psychoactive substances:
Council Decision 2008/206/JHA of 3 March 2008 on defining 1-benzylpiperazine (BZP) as a new psychoactive substance which is to be made subject to control measures and criminal provisions
Council Decision 2010/759/EU of 2 December 2010 on submitting 4-methylmethcathinone (mephedrone) to control measures

Sources 
European Monitoring Centre for Drugs and Drug Addiction | Legal topic overviews: Classification of controlled drugs – The EU system

See also 
Designer drugs
Recreational drug use
Single Convention on Narcotic Drugs
Convention on Psychotropic Substances
European law on drug precursors
European Monitoring Centre for Drugs and Drug Addiction

External links 
 Control measures EMCDDA
 Adopted legislation - Decisions to ban new psychoactive substances European Commission
Substances and classifications table (31/10/2008) – European Legal Database on Drugs report on all substances controlled in at least one EU country as of 31 October 2008 in XLS format 

Drug control law